The term "Lakan Dula Documents" is used by Philippine Historiographers to describe the section of the Spanish Archives in Manila which are dedicated to the genealogical records (cuadernos de linaje) of the "Manila aristocracy" from the period immediately following European colonial contact.  As of 2001, only one bundle of twelve folders (containing eleven distinct sets of documents) remains in the archive, the rest having been lost, misplaced, or destroyed by various events such as the Japanese Occupation of Manila during World War II.  The surviving bundle is labeled "Decendientes de Don Carlos Lacandola" (Descendants of Don Carlos Lacandola), and scholars use the term "Lacandola Documents" as an informal shortcut.  

Scholars specializing in the noble houses of  Rajah Matanda, Rajah Muda, and Lakandula mostly use these documents in conjunction with the Archivo General de Indias (General Archive of the Indies) in Seville, Spain in studying the genealogies of these "noble houses."  Other primary sources frequently referred to by historiographers are the Silsila or Tarsilas of Sulu, Maguindanao, and Brunei, and local records (usually Catholic parish registers) of towns where descendants of the three houses may have moved.

Contained Documents

See also 
Paramount rulers in early Philippine history
Rajahnate of Maynila
Tondo (historical polity)
Rajah Matanda
Rajah Sulayman
Lakandula
Agustin de Legaspi
Magat Salamat

References 

History of the Philippines (1565–1898)
Primary sources on Philippine history in the 16th century